The (two-way) wave equation is a second-order linear partial differential equation for the description of waves or standing wave fields as they occur in classical physics such as mechanical waves (e.g. water waves, sound waves and seismic waves) or electromagnetic waves (including light waves). It arises in fields like acoustics, electromagnetism, and fluid dynamics. Single mechanical or electromagnetic waves propagating in a pre-defined direction can also be described with the first-order one-way wave equation, which is much easier to solve and also valid for inhomogeneous media.

Introduction 
The (two-way) wave equation is a second-order partial differential equation describing waves, including traveling and standing waves; the latter can be considered as linear superpositions of waves traveling in opposite directions. This article mostly focuses on the scalar wave equation describing waves in scalars by scalar functions  of a time variable  (a variable representing time) and one or more spatial variables  (variables representing a position in a space under discussion), while there are vector wave equations describing waves in vectors such as waves for electrical field, magnetic field, and magnetic vector potential and elastic waves. By comparison with vector wave equations, the scalar wave equation can be seen as a special case of the vector wave equations; in the Cartesian coordinate system, the scalar wave equation is the equation to be satisfied by each component (for each coordinate axis, such as the x component for the x axis) of a vector wave without sources of waves in the considered domain (i.e., a space and time). Other scalar wave equation solutions  are for physical quantities in scalars such as pressure in a liquid or gas, or the displacement along some specific direction of particles of a vibrating solid away from their resting (equilibrium) positions.

The scalar wave equation is

where  is a fixed non-negative real coefficient.

In other words:
  is the factor representing a displacement from rest situation it could be gas pressure above or below normal, or the height of water in a pond above or below rest, or something else.
  represents time.
  is a term for how the displacement accelerates, i.e. not the speed at which the displacement is changing, but in fact the rate at which that displacement's speed is itself changing its acceleration.
  represents space or position.
  is a term for how the displacement is varying at the point  in one of the dimensions (like one of the axes on a graph). It's not the rate at which the displacement is changing across space, but in fact the rate at which the change itself is changing across space its second derivative. In other words, this term shows how the displacement's changes are squashed up in a tiny surrounding area. 

The equation states that at any given instance, at any given point, the way the displacement accelerates is proportional to the way the displacement's changes are squashed up in the surrounding area. Or, in even simpler terms, the way displacements get pushed around is proportional to how pointy the displacement is, and conversely.

Using the notations of Newtonian mechanics and vector calculus, the wave equation can be written more compactly as

An even more compact notation sometimes used in physics reads simply

where all operators are combined into the d'Alembert operator (denoted by a box):

A solution of this (two-way) wave equation can be quite complicated, but it can be analyzed as a linear combination of simple solutions that are sinusoidal plane waves with various directions of propagation and wavelengths but all with the same propagation speed . This analysis is possible because the wave equation is linear and homogeneous, so that any multiple of a solution is also a solution, and the sum of any two solutions is again a solution. This property is called the superposition principle in physics.

The wave equation alone does not specify a physical solution; a unique solution is usually obtained by setting a problem with further conditions, such as initial conditions, which prescribe the amplitude and phase of the wave. Another important class of problems occurs in enclosed spaces specified by boundary conditions, for which the solutions represent standing waves, or harmonics, analogous to the harmonics of musical instruments.

The two-way wave equation describing a standing wave field is the simplest example of a second-order hyperbolic differential equation. It and its modifications play fundamental roles in continuum mechanics, quantum mechanics, plasma physics, general relativity, geophysics, and many other scientific and technical disciplines. In the case that only the propagation of a single wave in a predefined direction is of interest, a first-order partial differential equation one-way wave equation can be considered.

Wave equation in one space dimension

The wave equation in one space dimension can be written as follows:

This equation is typically described as having only one space dimension , because the only other independent variable is the time . Nevertheless, the dependent variable  may represent a second space dimension, if, for example, the displacement  takes place in  direction, as in the case of a string that is located in the  plane.

Derivation of the wave equation
The wave equation in one space dimension can be derived in a variety of different physical settings. Most famously, it can be derived for the case of a string vibrating in a two-dimensional plane, with each of its elements being pulled in opposite directions by the force of tension.

Another physical setting for derivation of the wave equation in one space dimension uses Hooke's law. In the theory of elasticity, Hooke's law is an approximation for certain materials, stating that the amount by which a material body is deformed (the strain) is linearly related to the force causing the deformation (the stress).

From Hooke's law
The wave equation in the one-dimensional case can be derived from Hooke's law in the following way: imagine an array of little weights of mass  interconnected with massless springs of length . The springs have a spring constant of :
 

The forces exerted on the mass  at the location  are:

The equation of motion for the weight at the location  is given by equating these two forces:

If the array of weights consists of  weights spaced evenly over the length  of total mass , and the total spring constant of the array , we can write the above equation as

Taking the limit  and assuming smoothness, one gets

which is from the definition of a second derivative.  is the square of the propagation speed in this particular case.

Stress pulse in a bar
In the case of a stress pulse propagating longitudinally through a bar, the bar acts much like an infinite number of springs in series and can be taken as an extension of the equation derived for Hooke's law. A uniform bar, i.e. of constant cross-section, made from a linear elastic material has a stiffness  given by

The wave equation becomes

 is equal to the volume of the bar, and therefore

where  is the density of the material. The wave equation reduces to

The speed of a stress wave in a bar is therefore .

General solution

Algebraic approach 

The one-dimensional wave equation is unusual for a partial differential equation in that a relatively simple general solution may be found. Defining new variables

changes the wave equation into

which leads to the general solution

or equivalently,

In other words, solutions of the 1D wave equation are sums of a right-traveling function  and a left-traveling function . "Traveling" means that the shape of these individual arbitrary functions with respect to  stays constant, however, the functions are translated left and right with time at the speed . This was derived by Jean le Rond d'Alembert.

Another way to arrive at this result is to factor the wave equation into two one-way wave equations:

i.e.

As a result, if we define

then

From this,  must have the form , and from this the correct form of the full solution  can be deduced. The usual second-order wave equation is sometimes called the "two-way wave equation" (superposition of two waves) to distinguish it from the first-order one-way wave equation describing the wave propagation of a single wave in a pre-defined direction.

For an initial-value problem, the arbitrary functions  and  can be determined to satisfy initial conditions:

The result is d'Alembert's formula:

However, the waveforms  and  may also be generalized functions, such as the delta-function. In that case, the solution may be interpreted as an impulse that travels to the right or the left.

The basic wave equation is a linear differential equation, and so it will adhere to the superposition principle. This means that the net displacement caused by two or more waves is the sum of the displacements which would have been caused by each wave individually. In addition, the behavior of a wave can be analyzed by breaking up the wave into components, e.g. the Fourier transform breaks up a wave into sinusoidal components.

Plane-wave eigenmodes 

Another way to solve the one-dimensional wave equation is to first analyze its frequency eigenmodes. A so-called eigenmode is a solution that oscillates in time with a well-defined constant angular frequency , so that the temporal part of the wave function takes the form , and the amplitude is a function  of the spatial variable , giving a separation of variables for the wave function:

This produces an ordinary differential equation for the spatial part :

Therefore,

It has the well-known plane-wave solutions

with wave number .

The total wave function for this eigenmode is then the linear combination

where complex numbers ,  depend in general on any initial and boundary conditions of the problem.

Eigenmodes are useful in constructing a full solution to the wave equation, because each of them evolves in time trivially with the phase factor  so that a full solution can be decomposed into an eigenmode expansion:

or in terms of the plane waves,

which is exactly in the same form as in the algebraic approach. Functions  are known as the Fourier component and are determined by initial and boundary conditions. This is a so-called frequency-domain method, alternative to direct time-domain propagations, such as FDTD method, of the wave packet , which is complete for representing waves in absence of time dilations. The chirp wave solutions seem particularly implied by very large but previously inexplicable radar residuals in the flyby anomaly and differ from the sinusoidal solutions in being receivable at any distance only at proportionally shifted frequencies and time dilations, corresponding to past chirp states of the source.

Vectorial wave equation in three space dimensions
The vectorial wave equation (from which the scalar wave equation can be directly derived) can be obtained by applying a force equilibrium to an infinitesimal volume element. In a homogeneous continuum (cartesian coordinate ) with a constant modulus of elasticity  a vectorial, elastic deflection  causes the stress tensor . The local equilibrium of a) the tension force  due to deflection  and b) the inertial force  caused by the local acceleration  can be written as

By merging density  and elasticity module  the sound velocity  results (material law). After insertion, follows the well-known governing wave equation for a homogeneous medium:

The above vectorial partial differential equation of the 2nd order delivers two mutually independent solutions.
It can be shown for plane longitudinal wave propagation that the synthesis of two one-way wave equations leads to a general two-way wave equation. For  special two-wave equation with the d'Alembert operator results: 

For  this simplifies to

Therefore, the vectorial 1st-order one-way wave equation with waves travelling in a pre-defined propagation direction  results as

Scalar wave equation in three space dimensions
A solution of the initial-value problem for the wave equation in three space dimensions can be obtained from the corresponding solution for a spherical wave. The result can then be also used to obtain the same solution in two space dimensions.

Spherical waves
The wave equation can be solved using the technique of separation of variables. To obtain a solution with constant frequencies, let us first Fourier-transform the wave equation in time as

so we get

This is the Helmholtz equation and can be solved using separation of variables. If spherical coordinates are used to describe a problem, then the solution to the angular part of the Helmholtz equation is given by spherical harmonics, and the radial equation now becomes

Here , and the complete solution is now given by

Example
To gain a better understanding of the nature of these spherical waves, let us go back and look at the case when . In this case, there is no angular dependence, and the amplitude depends only on the radial distance i.e. . In this case, the wave equation reduces to

or

This equation can be rewritten as

where the quantity  satisfies the one-dimensional wave equation. Therefore, there are solutions in the form

The outgoing wave can be generated by a point source, and they make possible sharp signals whose form is altered only by a decrease in amplitude as  increases (see an illustration of a spherical wave on the top right). Such waves exist only in cases of space with odd dimensions.

For physical examples of solutions to the 3D wave equation that possess angular dependence, see dipole radiation.

Monochromatic spherical wave

Although the word "monochromatic" is not exactly accurate, since it refers to light or electromagnetic radiation with well-defined frequency, the spirit is to discover the eigenmode of the wave equation in three dimensions. Following the derivation in the previous section on plane-wave eigenmodes, if we again restrict our solutions to spherical waves that oscillate in time with well-defined constant angular frequency , then the transformed function  has simply plane-wave solutions:

or

From this we can observe that the peak intensity of the spherical-wave oscillation, characterized as the squared wave amplitude

Solution of a general initial-value problem
Therefore, we can generate a great variety of solutions by translating and summing spherical waves. Let  be an arbitrary function of three independent variables, and let the spherical wave form  be a delta function: that is, let  be a weak limit of continuous functions whose integral is unity, but whose support (the region where the function is non-zero) shrinks to the origin. Thus

If  is a superposition of such waves with weighting function , then

the denominator  is a convenience.

From the definition of the delta function,  may also be written as

It follows that

then

These formulas provide the solution for the initial-value problem for the wave equation. It does not depend upon data on the interior of this sphere. Thus the interior of the sphere is a lacuna for the solution. This phenomenon is called Huygens' principle. It is true for odd numbers of space dimension, where for one dimension the integration is performed over the boundary of an interval with respect to the Dirac measure. It is not satisfied in even space dimensions. The phenomenon of lacunas has been extensively investigated in Atiyah, Bott and Gårding (1970, 1973).

Scalar wave equation in two space dimensions
In two space dimensions, the wave equation is

We can use the three-dimensional theory to solve this problem if we regard  as a function in three dimensions that is independent of the third dimension. If

then the three-dimensional solution formula becomes

This integral may be rewritten as a double integral over the disc  with center  and radius 

It is apparent that the solution at  depends not only on the data on the light cone where

but also on data that are interior to that cone.

Scalar wave equation in general dimension and Kirchhoff's formulae

See Evans for more details.

Odd dimensions
Let  and let

Then
 ,
 ,
 .

Even dimensions
Let  and let

then

 in

Problems with boundaries

One space dimension

Reflection and transmission at the boundary of two media 
For an incident wave traveling from one medium (where the wave speed is ) to another medium (where the wave speed is ), one part of the wave will transmit into the second medium, while another part reflects back into the other direction and stays in the first medium. The amplitude of the transmitted wave and the reflected wave can be calculated by using the continuity condition at the boundary.

Therefore, the corresponding reflected wave and the transmitted wave will have the waveforms

The continuity condition at the boundary is

This gives the equations

and we have the reflectivity and transmissivity

When , the reflected wave has a reflection phase change of 180°, since . The energy conservation can be verified by

The limiting case of  corresponds to a "fixed end" that doesn't move, whereas the limiting case of  corresponds to a "free end".

The Sturm–Liouville formulation 
On the boundary points,  may satisfy a variety of boundary conditions. A general form that is appropriate for applications is

The case where  is required to vanish at an endpoint (i.e. "fixed end") is the limit of this condition when the respective  or  approaches infinity. The method of separation of variables consists in looking for solutions of this problem in the special form

A consequence is that

The eigenvalue  must be determined so that there is a non-trivial solution of the boundary-value problem

This is a special case of the general problem of Sturm–Liouville theory.

Investigation by numerical methods 

Approximating the continuous string with a finite number of equidistant mass points, one gets the following physical model:

and the vertical component of the force towards point  is

Taking the sum of these two forces and dividing with the mass , one gets for the vertical motion:

As the mass density is

this can be written

The wave equation is obtained by letting , in which case  takes the form , where  is continuous function of two variables,  takes the form , and

But the discrete formulation of the equation of state with a finite number of mass point is just the suitable one for a numerical propagation of the string motion. The boundary condition

where  is the length of the string, takes in the discrete formulation the form that for the outermost points  and  the equations of motion are

and

while for 

where .

Propagating these up to the times

using an 8th-order multistep method, the 6 states displayed in figure are found:

The red curve is the initial state at time zero, at which the string is "let free" in a predefined shape with all . The blue curve is the state at time  i.e. after a time that corresponds to the time a wave that is moving with the nominal wave velocity  would need for one fourth of the length of the string.

The wave travels towards right with the speed  without being actively constraint by the boundary conditions at the two extremes of the string. The shape of the wave is constant, i.e. the curve is indeed of the form .

The constraint on the right extreme starts to interfere with the motion, preventing the wave to raise the end of the string.

The direction of motion is reversed.

The wave now travels towards left, and the constraints at the end points are not active any more. When finally the other extreme of the string is reached, the direction will again be reversed in a way similar to what is displayed in the figure above for

Several space dimensions

The one-dimensional initial-boundary value theory may be extended to an arbitrary number of space dimensions. Consider a domain  in -dimensional  space, with boundary .

The initial conditions are

Thus the eigenfunction  satisfies

In the case of two space dimensions, the eigenfunctions may be interpreted as the modes of vibration of a drumhead stretched over the boundary . If  is a circle, then these eigenfunctions have an angular component that is a trigonometric function of the polar angle , multiplied by a Bessel function (of integer order) of the radial component. Further details are in Helmholtz equation.

If the boundary is a sphere in three space dimensions, the angular components of the eigenfunctions are spherical harmonics, and the radial components are Bessel functions of half-integer order.

Inhomogeneous wave equation in one dimension

The inhomogeneous wave equation in one dimension is

with initial conditions

The function  is often called the source function because in practice it describes the effects of the sources of waves on the medium carrying them. Physical examples of source functions include the force driving a wave on a string, or the charge or current density in the Lorenz gauge of electromagnetism.

One method to solve the initial-value problem (with the initial values as posed above) is to take advantage of a special property of the wave equation in an odd number of space dimensions, namely that its solutions respect causality. This can be seen in d'Alembert's formula, stated above, where these quantities are the only ones that show up in it.

In terms of finding a solution, this causality property means that for any given point on the line being considered, the only area that needs to be considered is the area encompassing all the points that could causally affect the point being considered. Suppose we integrate the inhomogeneous wave equation over this region:

To simplify this greatly, we can use Green's theorem to simplify the left side to get the following:

The left side is now the sum of three line integrals along the bounds of the causality region. These turn out to be fairly easy to compute:

In the above, the term to be integrated with respect to time disappears because the time interval involved is zero, thus .

For the other two sides of the region, it is worth noting that  is a constant, namely , where the sign is chosen appropriately. Using this, we can get the relation , again choosing the right sign:

And similarly for the final boundary segment:

Adding the three results together and putting them back in the original integral gives

In the last equation of the sequence, the bounds of the integral over the source function have been made explicit. Looking at this solution, which is valid for all choices  compatible with the wave equation, it is clear that the first two terms are simply d'Alembert's formula, as stated above as the solution of the homogeneous wave equation in one dimension. The difference is in the third term, the integral over the source.

Wave equation for inhomogeneous media, three-dimensional case
For one-way wave propagation, i.e. wave are travelling in a pre-defined wave direction ( or ) in inhomogeneous media, wave propagation can also be calculated with a tensorial one-way wave equation (resulting from factorization of the vectorial two-way wave equation), and an analytical solution can be derived.

Other coordinate systems
In three dimensions, the wave equation, when written in elliptic cylindrical coordinates, may be solved by separation of variables, leading to the Mathieu differential equation.

Further generalizations

Elastic waves

The elastic wave equation (also known as the Navier–Cauchy equation) in three dimensions describes the propagation of waves in an isotropic homogeneous elastic medium. Most solid materials are elastic, so this equation describes such phenomena as seismic waves in the Earth and ultrasonic waves used to detect flaws in materials. While linear, this equation has a more complex form than the equations given above, as it must account for both longitudinal and transverse motion:

where:
  is the density, 
  is the source function (driving force), 
  is the displacement vector.

By using , the elastic wave equation can be rewritten into the more common form of the Navier–Cauchy equation.

Note that in the elastic wave equation, both force and displacement are vector quantities. Thus, this equation is sometimes known as the vector wave equation.

Dispersion relation

In dispersive wave phenomena, the speed of wave propagation varies with the wavelength of the wave, which is reflected by a dispersion relation

See also

Acoustic attenuation
Acoustic wave equation
Bateman transform
Electromagnetic wave equation
Helmholtz equation
Inhomogeneous electromagnetic wave equation
Laplace operator
Mathematics of oscillation
Maxwell's equations
One-way wave equation
Schrödinger equation
Standing wave
Vibrations of a circular membrane
Wheeler–Feynman absorber theory

Notes

References
 M. F. Atiyah, R. Bott, L. Garding, "Lacunas for hyperbolic differential operators with constant coefficients I", Acta Math., 124 (1970), 109–189. 
 M. F. Atiyah, R. Bott, and L. Garding, "Lacunas for hyperbolic differential operators with constant coefficients II", Acta Math., 131 (1973), 145–206.
 R. Courant, D. Hilbert, Methods of Mathematical Physics, vol II. Interscience (Wiley) New York, 1962.
 L. Evans, "Partial Differential Equations". American Mathematical Society Providence, 1998.
 "Linear Wave Equations", EqWorld: The World of Mathematical Equations.
 "Nonlinear Wave Equations", EqWorld: The World of Mathematical Equations.
 William C. Lane, "MISN-0-201 The Wave Equation and Its Solutions", Project PHYSNET.

External links 

 Nonlinear Wave Equations by Stephen Wolfram and Rob Knapp, Nonlinear Wave Equation Explorer by Wolfram Demonstrations Project.
 Mathematical aspects of wave equations are discussed on the Dispersive PDE Wiki .
 Graham W Griffiths and William E. Schiesser (2009). Linear and nonlinear waves. Scholarpedia, 4(7):4308. doi:10.4249/scholarpedia.4308

Equations of physics
Hyperbolic partial differential equations
Wave mechanics